Wasootch Peak is a  mountain summit located in the Fisher Range of Kananaskis Country in the Canadian Rockies of Alberta, Canada. The peak is situated on the northern end of the ridge that separates Wasootch Creek from Porcupine creek. Wasootch Peak's nearest higher peak is Old Baldy,  to the southeast. The peak may be seen from Highway 40, and is prominently featured from the ski slopes at Nakiska. Wasootch is from the Stoney language word wazi, which translated means unique.

Geology

Wasootch Peak is composed of sedimentary rock laid down during the Precambrian to Jurassic periods. Formed in shallow seas, this sedimentary rock was pushed east and over the top of younger rock during the Laramide orogeny.

Climate

Based on the Köppen climate classification, Wasootch Peak is located in a subarctic climate zone with cold, snowy winters, and mild summers. Precipitation runoff from the mountain drains into Wasootch Creek and the Kananaskis River.

See also
Mountains of Alberta
Geology of Alberta

References

External links
 Localized weather: Mountain Forecast
 Climbing Wasootch Peak: Explor8ion.com

Wasootch Peak
Wasootch Peak
Alberta's Rockies